Jerry Lam Lok Yin (born 19 November 2001) is a Hong Kong professional footballer who currently plays as a midfielder for Hong Kong Premier League club HK U23.

Club career
In August 2019, Lam signed his first professional contract with Hong Kong Premier League club Happy Valley. 

On 9 August 2021, Lam joined Eastern. He left the club on 9 July 2022.

Personal life
Lam's elder brother, Jordan, is also a professional footballer who is currently playing for Resources Capital.

References

External links
 HKFA

2001 births
Living people
Hong Kong footballers
Association football midfielders
Happy Valley AA players
Eastern Sports Club footballers
HK U23 Football Team players
Hong Kong Premier League players